Werner Heinrich Janssen (born 7 August 1944 in Mönchengladbach) is a Dutch/German philosopher, Germanist, author and poet under the pseudonym Heinz Hof.

Career 
Werner Janssen grew up both in Germany (Monchengladbach) and in the Netherlands (Kerkrade/Heerlen). He studied at the Universities of Nijmegen, Heidelberg, Amsterdam and Aachen German language and literature, philosophy, sociology, pedagogy, ethnology, political science, psychology and dialect knowledge.

Very first he graduated in 1984 to Dr. lit. at the University of Amsterdam with the thesis Der Rhythmus bei Heinrich Böll, 1985 published by Peter-Lang-Verlag. At the University of Aachen,  the Rhenish-Westphalian Technical University he graduated in 1991 to Dr. phil. with the thesis Kultur und Spiel – die dialogische Erweiterung des natürlichen Spielraums, also published by Peter Lang.

He is chairman of the Curatorium of the Martin Buber-Award, which is annually granted since 2002 at the International Culture and Science Festival Euriade, which was set up by him in 1981 and which director he is, just as he is the director of the International Chamber Music Festival AmadèO – Academia Musica da Camera.

He taught German Language and Philosophy at Bernardinuscollege in Heerlen, and is now professor of Philosophy and Germanistics among others at the Lomonosow University of Moscow.

He gave/gives guest lectures at the Universities of Perm (Ural), Vienna, Graz and Heerlen.

With the pseudonym Heinz Hof he writes poetry.

Excerpt of his publications 

Der Rhythmus des Humanen bei Heinrich Böll. Peter Lang, Frankfurt am Main 1985, 
Kultur und Spiel. Die dialogische Erweiterung des natürlichen Spielraums. Peter Lang, Frankfurt am Main 1991, 
 Een bloem tussen het puin. Inleiding tot de verhalen en romans van Heinrich Böll. Walva-Boek, Laren 1991, 
 Lies und sprich! Gespreksvaardigheid voor de onderbouw. Walraven, Apeldoorn 1995, 
 Von der Straße in die Baracken … und dann? Lang, Frankfurt am Main 1995, 
 Eine Blume zwischen den Trümmern. Einführung in das Leben und Werk von Heinrich Böll. Erebodos, Voerendaal 2005, 
 Du. Gedichte. Eine Begegnung zwischen dem Dichter Heinz Hof und dem Maler Antonio Máro. Erebodos, Voerendaal 2006, 
 Mozartina. Neue Mozartbriefe zur Zeit. Erebodos, Voerendaal 2006
 Kind, Gedichte exercises about child with paintings and photos by Antonio Máro, Rafael Ramírez and Jorgen Polman. 2007
 Liebeslicht. Gedichte and Märchen by the 80th anniversary of Antonio Máro. 2008
 Symphonia, Die Kunst des Dialogs. Philosophische Betrachtungen. Erebodos, Voerendaal 2009. 
 Essays und Betrachtungen in several magazines of the EURIADE-Magazine for Culture and Science „EuriArtes“.

External links 
 Publications by and about Werner Janssen at the catalogue of the Dutch National Library 
 Kultur und Spiel with a short biography at the Peter Lang Editor Group http://www.peterlang.de/index.cfm?vID=44209&vLang=D&vHR=1&vUR=2&vUUR=1
 website of „Stichting Euriade“ http://www.euriade.net/

1944 births
Living people
Germanists
20th-century German philosophers
20th-century Dutch philosophers
21st-century German philosophers
21st-century Dutch philosophers
Academic staff of Moscow State University
University of Amsterdam alumni
People from Mönchengladbach
German male writers